Western Slovakia is one of the four NUTS-2 Regions of Slovakia. It was created at the same time as were the Nitra, Trnava and Trenčín regions.  Western Slovakia is the most populated of the four regions of Slovakia and its GDP per capita is 69% of the European Union average (€20,600 per year).

References

NUTS 2 statistical regions of Slovakia
NUTS 2 statistical regions of the European Union